Tomás Orlando Pérez Garcia (born December 29, 1973) is a Venezuelan former professional baseball infielder and current batting practice pitcher for the Atlanta Braves of Major League Baseball (MLB). Pérez was a utility infielder who throws right-handed and switch hits. As of 2019, he is an infield instructor for the Atlanta Braves.

Before landing in Philadelphia in 2000, Pérez had played for the Toronto Blue Jays from 1995 to 1998, where he was selected under the provisions of the Rule 5 draft. He has also played for the Tampa Bay Devil Rays and the Houston Astros at the MLB level. Pérez is considered to be versatile because of his ability to play all four infield positions.

Professional career
Pérez had his best year in 2003. Shifted between third base, second base, first base, shortstop, right field, and also as an emergency pitcher, Pérez was an asset off the bench. Known for throwing shaving cream pies, Pérez was a popular player with both fans and teammates alike in his six years in Philadelphia.

Despite being signed through 2006, Pérez was released by the Phillies on April 2, 2006; he signed a contract with the Tampa Bay Devil Rays on April 6. On Mother's Day, May 14, 2006, Perez was one of more than 50 hitters who brandished a pink bat to benefit the Breast Cancer Foundation.  In 2006, he became the fourth player in Tampa Bay history to have four extra-base hits in a game, a feat that wasn't again matched by a Rays player until Sam Fuld did in April 2011.

On May 30, 2007, he was traded from the Los Angeles Dodgers to the Chicago White Sox for Dwayne Pollok. Through 2008, Pérez was a .240 hitter with 24 home runs and 180 RBI in 789 games.  On November 22, 2007, Perez signed a minor league contract with an invitation to spring training with the Houston Astros. He was added to the 25-man roster by the end of spring training. He played 8 games in the majors for Houston and became a free agent at the end of the season.

He signed with the Colorado Rockies in March 2009 but was released by the organization a month later.

On February 9, 2011 Italian baseball team Bbc Grosseto signed Tomàs Pérez to one-year contract, but he was waived on March 6 due to an elbow injury.

Perez was named as the infield coach for the A advanced Florida Fire Frogs in the Atlanta Braves organization for the 2018 season.

See also
 List of Major League Baseball players from Venezuela

References

External links

Tomás Pérez at Baseball Library
Tomás Pérez at Pura Pelota (Venezuelan Professional Baseball League)

1973 births
Living people
Burlington Bees players
Cardenales de Lara players
Caribes de Anzoátegui players
Charlotte Knights players
Edmonton Trappers players
Gulf Coast Expos players
Houston Astros players
Las Vegas 51s players
Leones del Caracas players
Major League Baseball infielders
Major League Baseball players from Venezuela
Navegantes del Magallanes players
Pastora de Occidente players
Sportspeople from Barquisimeto
Petroleros de Cabimas players
Philadelphia Phillies players
Reading Phillies players
Round Rock Express players
Scranton/Wilkes-Barre Red Barons players
Syracuse Chiefs players
Syracuse SkyChiefs players
Tampa Bay Devil Rays players
Toronto Blue Jays players
Venezuelan baseball coaches
Venezuelan expatriate baseball players in Canada
Venezuelan expatriate baseball players in the United States
World Baseball Classic players of Venezuela
2006 World Baseball Classic players